Camp Nelson can refer to:

Camp Nelson, California, U.S.
Camp Nelson Confederate Cemetery in Lonoke County, Arkansas, U.S.
Camp Nelson National Cemetery in Jessamine County, Kentucky, U.S.
Camp Nelson National Monument in Jessamine County, Kentucky, U.S.

See also
Fort Nelson (disambiguation)